"Pani Da Rang" is a song from the 2012 Indian film Vicky Donor, written and composed by Ayushmann Khurrana and Rochak Kohli. The song was performed in the film by Khurrana in his role as the titular Vicky. A longer version of the song was composed with female vocals performed by Sukanya Purkayastha which was also played in the film.

Composition
Ayushmann Khurrana wrote "Pani Da Rang" in 2003 in collaboration with Rochak Kohli during their time at DAV College. The song is written almost entirely in Punjabi.

Use in Vicky Donor
"Pani Da Rang" is performed by Khurrana's character Vicky Arora for Ashima Roy, played by Yami Gautam, after they decide to get married; it continues to play in the background as the characters share romantic and intimate moments together.

The slower, female version of the song plays in background during scenes following Vicky and Ashima's separation.

Awards

References

External links
 
 

Indian songs
Hindi film songs
2012 songs
Punjabi-language songs